Rang (Lamma) is a clan of Mumuye tribe In Lamma ward Zing local government area of Taraba State, Nigeria. It is spoken in and around Lamma, and in Zanto Lamma or Zori, Besagba, Koyu, and Jauro Nasaraawo Jereng. Rang is the first clan to settled in Lamma

References

Languages of Nigeria
Mumuye–Yendang languages